John T. Koch is an American academic, historian and linguist who specializes in Celtic studies, especially prehistory and the early Middle Ages. He is the editor of the five-volume Celtic Culture. A Historical Encyclopedia (2006, ABC Clio). He is perhaps best known as the leading proponent of the Celtic from the West hypothesis.

Career
He is a graduate of Harvard University, where he was awarded the degrees of MA and PhD in Celtic Languages and Literatures in 1983 and 1985, respectively. He has also pursued studies at Jesus College, Oxford, and the University of Wales, Aberystwyth. He has taught Celtic Studies at Harvard University and Boston College.

Since 1998, he has been senior research fellow or reader at the Centre for Advanced Welsh and Celtic Studies, University of Wales, where he has supervised a research project called Celtic Languages and Cultural Identity, the output of which includes the five-volume Celtic Culture: A Historical Encyclopedia (2006), and An Atlas for Celtic Studies (2007).

He has published widely on aspects of early Irish and Welsh language, literature and history. His works include The Celtic Heroic Age (first published in 1994, 4th edition in 2003), in collaboration with John Carey; The Gododdin of Aneirin (1997), an edition, translation and discussion of the early Welsh poem Y Gododdin; and numerous articles published in books and journals. A grammar of Old Welsh and a book on the historical Taliesin are in the works.

In 2007, John Koch received a personal chair at the University of Wales.

Koch supervises (as senior fellow and project leader) the Ancient Britain and the Atlantic Zone Project (covering Ireland, Armorica, and the Iberian Peninsula) at the University of Wales Centre for Advanced Welsh and Celtic Studies. In 2008, Koch gave the O'Donnell Lecture at Aberystwyth University titled People called Keltoi, the La Tène Style, and ancient Celtic languages: the threefold Celts in the light of geography. In 2009, Koch published a paper, later that year developed into a book, Tartessian: Celtic from the Southwest at the Dawn of History, detailing how the Tartessian language may have been the earliest directly attested Celtic language with the Tartessian written script used in the inscriptions based on a version of a Phoenician script in use around 825 BC. This was followed by Tartessian 2: Preliminaries to Historical Phonology in 2011, focused on the Mesas do Castelinho inscription.

Ideas
Koch has been a leading proponent of the Celtic from the West hypothesis, the idea that the Celtic languages originated as a branch of the Indo-European languages not in Eastern Europe, from where they radiated westward, but rather that they arose in Iberia (modern Spain and Portugal) among the Celtiberians and neighboring peoples as a combination of Proto-Indo-European and native non-Indo-European Paleohispanic languages (related to Basque), with some Phoenician influence. From there (in this scenario) they spread east to what was later Gaul (modern France, Germany, and surrounding areas), where early forms of the Italic and Germanic languages already would have been developing independently from Proto-Indo-European. This idea, the subject of three edited volumes in a series by Koch and Barry Cunliffe called Celtic from the West (2012–2016), is controversial.

Published books
 Co-editor: 
 
 Co-editor: 
 
 Co-editor: 
 Co-author:  (2 vols.).
 
 
 Editor  (4 vols.).
 Co-editor:  (2 vols.).
 Co-editor: 
 Co-editor: 
 
 Co-editor:

References

External links
Personal webpage, University of Wales.

Harvard University alumni
Celtic studies scholars
Living people
Alumni of the University of Wales
Alumni of Jesus College, Oxford
Boston College faculty
Harvard University faculty
Year of birth missing (living people)